Grevillea fistulosa, commonly known as Barrens grevillea or Mount Barren grevillea, is a species of flowering plant in the family Proteaceae and is endemic to the Fitzgerald River National Park in the south-west of Western Australia. It is an erect shrub with narrowly egg-shaped to broadly linear leaves and clusters of orange-red to scarlet flowers.

Description
The edges of the leaves are turned down or rolled under, the upper surface of the leaves more or less smooth, the lower surface felty or woolly-hairy or obscured.

Taxonomy
Grevillea fistulosa was first formally described in 1974 by Alex George in the journal Nuytsia from specimens collected on Middle Mount Barren in the Fitzgerald River National Park by Charles Gardner and William Blackall in 1925. The specific epithet (fistulosa) means "hollow like a pipe", referring to the leaves.

Distribution and habitat
Barrens grevillea grows in dense scrub in rocky gullies on hills in the Fitzgerald River National Park.

Conservation status
This grevillea is listed as "not threatened" by the Department of Biodiversity, Conservation and Attractions.

See also
 List of Grevillea species

References

fistulosa
Proteales of Australia
Eudicots of Western Australia